Warren is an unincorporated community in Albemarle County, Virginia.

Walker House was added to the National Register of Historic Places in 1990.

References

Unincorporated communities in Albemarle County, Virginia
Unincorporated communities in Virginia